Kevin Politz (born March 22, 1996) is an American soccer player.

Career

Youth
Politz was born in New Haven, Connecticut, but grew up in the Morganville section of Marlboro Township, New Jersey where he attended Marlboro High School and was a member of the New York Red Bulls Academy. He was also a member of the US Soccer residency program at IMG Academy.  He attended college at Wake Forest University and played on the Demon Deacons soccer team for three seasons, making 72 appearances, scoring 3 goals and tallying 1 assist. In 2017, Politz was named an All-American and the ACC Defender of the Year.

While in college, Politz appeared for Premier Development League side New York Red Bulls U-23.

New York Red Bulls
On January 3, 2018, Politz signed a homegrown contract with the New York Red Bulls. On March 15, 2018, the New York Red Bulls entered into a loan agreement with New York Red Bulls II, and Politz was listed on the Red Bulls II 2018 USL season roster. He made his professional debut on March 17, 2018 for United Soccer League side New York Red Bulls II, coming on as a second half substitution in a 2–1 win over Toronto FC II. Politz and Red Bull II finished in 5th place in the Eastern Conference standings. Red Bull II advanced to the USL Championship Eastern Conference finals by defeating Charleston Battery and FC Cincinnati on the road by 1-0 scorelines before falling to eventual USL Championship champions, Louisville City FC. Politz was released by the Red Bulls at the end of their 2018 season.

Greenville Triumph
In February 2019 Politz signed with USL League One team Greenville Triumph SC. Politz scored the game-winning goal for Greenville in the team's inaugural home match victory over Lansing Ignite, it was Politz's first professional goal and he was named to the USL one team of the week. For the 2019 season he appeared in 27 of the team's 28 games, starting 25 of them. Greenville advanced to the USL League One final, falling to North Texas SC in the championship match.

Hartford Athletic
On December 19, 2019, Greenville transferred Politz to USL Championship team Hartford Athletic. In his second match with the team he scored his second career professional goal. Politz started 14 of 16 regular season games, helping Hartford finish with the second most points in the USL Championship. Politz started in Hartford's first ever playoff game, a 1-0 home loss to Saint Louis FC.

Toronto FC II
On May 5, 2021, Politz joined USL League One side Toronto FC II. He scored his first goal for the team in a 1-0 victory on October 8 against New England Revolution II.

International career
In 2012, Politz made one appearance for the United States U17 team.

Career statistics

Honors

Club
New York Red Bulls
MLS Supporters' Shield (1): 2018

References

External links
 
 
 Wake Forest University bio

1996 births
Living people
American soccer players
Wake Forest Demon Deacons men's soccer players
New York Red Bulls U-23 players
New York Red Bulls players
New York Red Bulls II players
Association football defenders
Soccer players from New Jersey
USL League Two players
USL Championship players
Marlboro High School alumni
People from Marlboro Township, New Jersey
Sportspeople from New Haven, Connecticut
Sportspeople from Monmouth County, New Jersey
Greenville Triumph SC players
USL League One players
Hartford Athletic players
Homegrown Players (MLS)
Toronto FC II players